Kasti also known as Kaasti is a panchayat village in the state of Rajasthan, India.   Administratively, Kasti is under Bawadi tehsil of Jodhpur District in Rajasthan.  Kasti is 8 km by gravel road east of the village of Netran (Netra) and National Highway 65. It is 8 km by hard-surfaced road southeast of the town of Baori.

There are two villages in the Kasti gram panchayat" Kasti and Lunawas.

Demographics 
In the 2001 census, the village of Kasti had 2,017 inhabitants, with 1,011 males (50.1%) and 1,006 females (49.9%), for a gender ratio of 995 females per thousand males.

Notes

External links 
 

Villages in Jodhpur district